Kim Plugge (born 6 June 1975 in Alkmaar, Netherlands) is a Swiss rower. Along with Pia Vogel she finished 5th in the women's lightweight double sculls at the 2000 Summer Olympics.

References 
 
 

1975 births
Living people
Swiss female rowers
Sportspeople from Alkmaar
Olympic rowers of Switzerland
Rowers at the 2000 Summer Olympics